Governor Lynch may refer to:

Charles Lynch (politician) (1783–1853), 8th and 11th Governor of Mississippi
John Lynch (New Hampshire governor) (born 1952), 80th Governor of New Hampshire
James Rolph (1869–1934), 27th Governor of California, nicknamed Governor Lynch